Vincent Bradford (born March 3, 1955) is an American fencer. She competed in the women's individual and team foil events at the 1984 Summer Olympics.

References

External links
 

1955 births
Living people
American female foil fencers
Olympic fencers of the United States
Fencers at the 1984 Summer Olympics
Pan American Games medalists in fencing
Pan American Games silver medalists for the United States
Pan American Games bronze medalists for the United States
Fencers at the 1979 Pan American Games
Fencers at the 1983 Pan American Games
Fencers at the 1987 Pan American Games
21st-century American women
20th-century American women